The 2014–15 Liga Nacional de Fútbol de Guatemala season was the 16th season in which the Apertura and Clausura season was used. The season began on 19 July 2014 and ended on 23 May 2015.

Format
The format for both championships are identical. Each championship will have two stages: a first stage and a playoff stage. The first stage of each championship is a double round-robin format. The teams that finish first and second in the standings will advance to the playoffs semifinals, while the teams that finish 3–6 will enter in the quarterfinals. The winner of each quarterfinal will advance to the semifinals. The winners of the semifinals will advance to the finals, which will determine the tournament champion.

Teams

Torneo Apertura
The 2014 Torneo Apertura began on July 19, 2014 and ended on December 20, 2014.

Standings

Results

Playoffs
Quarterfinals

First Leg

Second Leg

Semifinals

First Leg

Second Leg

Finals

First Leg

Second Leg

Top Goalscorers

List of foreign players in the league
This is a list of foreign players in Clausura 2014. The following players:
have played at least one apertura game for the respective club.
have not been capped for the Guatemala national football team on any level, independently from the birthplace

A new rule was introduced a few season ago, that clubs can only have five foreign players per club and can only add a new player if there is an injury or player/s is released.Antigua GFC   
  Israel Silva
  Tomas de Souza
  Roberto Carlos Pena 
  Mario PineiroDeportivo Coatepeque  Jose Calderon
  Miguel LavieCSD Comunicaciones    Paolo Suarez
 Guastatoya    Diner Cordova
  Jose de Santiago
  Victor Solalinde
  Lelis RomanHalcones FC  TBDDeportivo Malacateco  TBD

 (player released during the season)Deportivo Marquense NoneC.S.D. Municipal   Kevin Santamaria
  Santiago Morandi
  Maximiliano Callorda  
  Diego de SouzaDeportivo Petapa  Juan Lovato
  Adrian ApellanizC.D. Suchitepéquez  Shane Mooney OrioUniversidad de San Carlos (Guatemalan football club)  Fernando Gallo 
  Sergio Mendoza
  Guillermo ReyesClub Xelajú MC  TBD

Torneo Clausura
The 2015 Torneo Clausura began on 18 January 2015 and ended on 23 May 2015.

Personnel and sponsoring

During the season

Standings

Results

Playoffs

Quarterfinals

First Leg

Second Leg

Suchitepéquez won 1–0 on aggregate.

Antigua won 3–1 on aggregate.

Semifinals

First Leg

Second Leg

Comunicaciones won 6-2 on aggregate.

Municipal won 3-1 on aggregate.

Finals

First Leg

Second Leg

Comunicaciones won 4-3 on aggregate.

Top goalscorers

List of foreign players in the league
This is a list of foreign players in Clausura 2014. The following players:
have played at least one apertura game for the respective club.
have not been capped for the Guatemala national football team on any level, independently from the birthplace

A new rule was introduced a few season ago, that clubs can only have five foreign players per club and can only add a new player if there is an injury or player/s is released.Antigua GFC   
  Anderson Pasos Baptista
  Olman Vargas
  Roberto Carlos Pena 
  Minor ÁlvarezDeportivo Coatepeque  Jose Calderon
  Armando Polo
  Augusto César Gómez 
  Roberto PorrasCSD Comunicaciones    Paolo Suarez
  Joel Benítez
  Rolando Blackburn
  Agustín HerreraGuastatoya    Victor Solalinde
  Diner Cordoba
  Gabriel Garcete
  Fernando GalloHalcones FC  Evandro Ferreira de Moura
  Ismael Soares
  Romel Murillo
  Fernando GalloDeportivo Malacateco  Ricardo Mina Romero
  Leonardo García
  Ricardo Rocha
  Orvin Paz
  Randy Diamond

 (player released during the season)Deportivo Marquense NoneC.S.D. Municipal   Kevin Santamaria
  Jaime Alas
  Maximiliano Callorda  
  Diego de SouzaDeportivo Petapa  Juan Lovato
  Adrian Apellaniz
  Lucas MarçalC.D. Suchitepéquez  Shane Orio
  Jesús Benítez
  Jefferson AnguloUniversidad SC  Fernando Gallo 
  Sergio Mendoza
  Guillermo ReyesClub Xelajú MC'''
  Juliano Rangel de Andrade
  Javier Guarino
  Aslinn Rodas

References

External links
 http://www.prensalibre.com/Deportes/FutbolNacional

Liga Nacional de Fútbol de Guatemala seasons
1
Guatemala